The Commissar Vanishes: The Falsification of Photographs and Art in Stalin's Russia is a 1997 book by David King about the censoring of photographs and fraudulent creation of "photographs" in Joseph Stalin's Soviet Union through silent alteration via airbrushing and other techniques.  It has an introduction by Stephen F. Cohen.

Album

Michael Nyman created a companion album of the same title in 1999.  The second disc of the two-disc album contains The Fall of Icarus, the score to an eponymous art installation by Peter Greenaway from 1986 which had previously been unreleased.  The first disc, The Commissar Vanishes, is a version of The Fall of Icarus that has been defaced similarly to the photographs reproduced in King's book.

Track listing
Disc 1: The Commissar Vanishes
Earth In Turmoil
Jealousy And Revenge
Look Out For An Enemy!
Ordinary Citizens
A Swift Exit

Disc: 2: The Fall of Icarus
Disaster
Wings
Walls
Water
Utopia

Documentary
A documentary was made about David King and The Commissar Vanishes called, Facing the Dead by Gabrielle Pfeiffer.  The film was commissioned by Arte and broadcast internationally.  It won the "Golden Gate Award" at the San Francisco International Film Festival.

References

External links 
 

Art history books
1997 non-fiction books
Case studies
Metropolitan Books books
Canongate Books books
Censorship in the Soviet Union